Luica is a commune in Călărași County, Muntenia, Romania. It is composed of two villages, Luica and Valea Stânii.

As of 2007 the population of Luica is 2,118.

References

Luica
Localities in Muntenia